Edexcel (also known since 2013 as Pearson Edexcel) is a British multinational education and examination body formed in 1996 and wholly owned by Pearson plc since 2005. It is the only privately owned examination board in the United Kingdom. Its name is a portmanteau term combining the words education and excellence.

Edexcel regulates school examinations under the British Curriculum and offers qualifications for schools on the international and regional scale. It is the UK's largest awarding organisation offering academic and vocational qualifications in schools, colleges and work places in the UK and abroad. It is also recognised internationally. In 2019, Edexcel was the focus of significant controversy following a leak of an A-level examination.

History
Edexcel was formed in 1996 by the merger of two bodies, the BTEC (Business & Technology Education Council) and ULEAC (University of London Examinations and Assessment Council). In 2003, the Edexcel Foundation (the charity that managed the board) formed a partnership with Pearson plc to set up a new company called London Qualifications Ltd, which was 75% owned by Pearson and 25% by the Edexcel Foundation. London Qualifications Limited changed its name to Edexcel Limited in November 2004 and is now known colloquially as Edexcel and formally as Edexcel Pearson - London Examinations.

In 2005, Edexcel became the only large examination board to be held in private hands, when Pearson plc took complete control. Edexcel subsequently received investment from their new parent company.

Edexcel also offers IAL, known as International Advanced Levels. It is offered only to schools outside the UK. It is considered by the UK NARIC (the National Recognition Information Centre for the United Kingdom) to be of a comparable standard as the GCE Advanced Level. In addition, Edexcel provides the Edexcel International Diploma (ID) which involves the study of 4 A-Levels (3 full A-Levels and 1 AS-Level in either General Studies or Global Development). The British curriculum offered by the Edexcel International board is among the most taught at International Schools along with the curricula offered by Cambridge International Examinations and, the International Baccalaureate Organization.

On 3 April 2013, Pearson rebranded Edexcel and all of its exams 'Pearson Edexcel', in line with a name change that added the prefix 'Pearson' to all of its brands.

Incorporated Examination Boards
 Business Education Council (BEC)
 Business and Technology Education Council (BTEC)
East Anglian Examinations Board (EAEB) – partial
 Joint Committee for Business Studies and Public Administration (JCBSPA)
London East Anglia Group (LEAG)
 London Regional Examining Board (LREB) – created in 1979
 Metropolitan and Middlesex Regional Examining Boards (M&MREB) – created in 1979
 Metropolitan Regional Examination Board (MREB)
 Middlesex Regional Examination Board (MREB)
 Technician Education Council (TEC)
 University Entrance and Schools Examinations Council (UESEC)
 University of London Examinations and Assessment Council (ULEAC)
 University of London Schools Examination Board (ULSEB)

Controversies
As Edexcel is the only privately owned examination board in the UK, questions have been raised on whether the examination board is acting in the best interest of students, or solely as a profit making business, due to the wide range of Edexcel-endorsed text books published by Pearson, the international multi-billion company which owns the board.

2007 
In 2007 it was reported that teachers using Edexcel Music examinations were allowing students to listen to confidential listening paper CDs several days before the examination, by abusing the trust given by the exam board to only check for technical issues. Other exam boards do not allow the practice of checking discs, with AQA specifically instructing teachers not to open the packages containing the CDs before exams.

2014 
In 2014 the loss of an A-Level Core Mathematics C3 Mathematics exam being delivered to an international school in Amsterdam led to a replacement paper being published for the Summer examination series; however, 60 students in the UK took the original paper due to it mistakenly being handed out in two UK and two overseas centres, while the replacement paper was taken by 34,000 students. The replacement paper was criticised for including questions that were not present on the syllabus, and that the students taking the original paper would be unfairly marked.

2015

Difficulty 
In June 2015, students across the United Kingdom who had taken an Edexcel GCSE Maths paper expressed anger and confusion over questions that "did not make sense" and were "ridiculous", mocking the exam on Twitter. On a Sky News segment, presenter Adam Boulton answered one of the paper's 'hardest' questions with a former maths teacher. As a result, GCSE students across the UK signed a petition made by a candidate requesting that the exam board lowers the grade boundaries as the examination was too hard.

Gender representation 
An additional petition was started by a 17-year-old student requesting to "Ensure the representation of women on the A-Level Music syllabus." The petition asks that music composed by women be added to the Edexcel A-Level Music syllabus which "has a total of 63 different set works from a variety of musical genres and eras." After six days, the petition had over 1,800 signatures and was featured in The Guardian.

2019

Question duplication 
In June, Paper 3 of the Mathematics GCSE (Higher Tier, 1MA1/03) appeared to contain an exam question which was published in an AQA (another British exam board) Further Mathematics textbook. The exam question had the same diagram, values and answer as the question in the textbook. Pearson Edexcel said that they were investigating how this might have happened.

Exam difficulty concerns from students
After students sat the Paper 2 of the new specification Mathematics A-Level (9MA0), many students complained online expressing that the difficulty of the exam was too high and unlike anything seen in past papers. One online petition to lower grade boundaries was signed by thousands of users. Before results day, Pearson Edexcel released a video addressing students about the difficulty concerns and mentioned that independent experts did confirm that the exam was "fair and valid". They acknowledged the first two questions of the exam were more difficult than anticipated, and also claimed that they would make "small adjustments" to "improve the experience" of the exam for future students.

Leak 
Further controversy ensued after the Paper 3 of the new specification Mathematics A-Level (9MA0/3H – sat 14 June), appeared to have been accessed by someone who, late in the night before the exam sitting, posted on Twitter that they would sell a copy of the exam paper for £70. Pearson Edexcel launched an investigation after becoming aware that some scribbled out images of the exam paper were circulated online prior the exam sitting, and found one centre (out of thirty-eight possible suspect centres in one geographic location), who were visited at a very short notice, to have committed a serious and "possibly criminally motivated" security breach of the A-Level maths paper.

Students expressed frustration about the incident; BBC News reported that students believed the incident could have the potential to affect their results. Pearson Edexcel stated that they have "well-established processes to ensure fair and accurate results" and that "grade boundaries will not be affected". On 17 June Edexcel stated that the compromised questions could be removed from the overall assessment, as well as undertaking additional statistical analysis to identify irregular result patterns for particular centres or students.

About 60,000 students were affected in this incident. Two men aged 29 and 32 were arrested on 24 June on suspicion of theft. The men were released under investigation while inquiries continued. Ahead of results day, it was revealed that 78 students who were suspected of being at an advantage from malpractice would have their results withheld. This is the largest number of candidates to be withheld results from a single malpractice incident.

Extremely low A-level mathematics grade boundaries 
After a leak of the A-Level Grade Boundaries ahead of results day, it emerged that in order to pass the new specification Mathematics A-Level (9MA0), candidates needed to score 14% (43 marks out of 300) to pass. OCR (another British exam board) also had similarly low grade boundaries. After these extremely low grade boundaries added flavour to many news headlines, Ofqual said that they were confident the grade boundaries this year were "sound", so shifted their focus onto the previous year's grade boundaries for the new Mathematics A-Level for the 2,000 students who sat it after studying it for one year. Ofqual said "We want to understand why the grade boundaries were so different between the two years.", and had called the significant shifts in boundaries "unusual".

None of the exam boards decided to re-open the 2018 award, after being asked to look at them again by the regulator. This could potentially result in students who sat the new specification Mathematics A-Level (9MA0) in 2018 having their results changed.

References

External links
 Official website

British companies established in 1996
Education companies established in 1996
Qualification awarding bodies in the United Kingdom
Examination boards in the United Kingdom
Education companies of the United Kingdom
Pearson plc
2005 mergers and acquisitions